Cypricercus elegans is a species of freshwater ostracod in the family Cyprididae. It is found in Colombia.

References

Further reading

External links 
 
 
 Cypricercus at insectoid.info

Cyprididae
Arthropods of Colombia
Crustaceans described in 1986